The Skeels Corner Slate is a geologic formation in Vermont. It preserves fossils dating back to the Cambrian period.

See also

 List of fossiliferous stratigraphic units in Vermont
 Paleontology in Vermont

References
 

Cambrian geology of Vermont